Florian Liegl (born 1 February 1983) is an Austrian former ski jumper who competed from 1999 to 2007. His career highlight was winning a World Cup competition on 1 February 2003 in Kulm. Liegl has since worked as an assistant coach for the Austrian national ski jumping team.

World Cup career

Standings

Wins

References

1983 births
Living people
Austrian male ski jumpers
Universiade medalists in ski jumping
Sportspeople from Innsbruck
Austrian ski jumping coaches
Universiade silver medalists for Austria
Competitors at the 2005 Winter Universiade